The Dinagat gymnure (Podogymnura aureospinula) is a species of mammal in the family Erinaceidae. It is endemic to the Philippines.

Its natural habitat is subtropical or tropical dry forests. It is threatened by habitat loss. The mammal is an evolutionaringly distinct and globally endangered species in the Philippines as identified by the Zoological Society of London in their EDGE species program, where it ranked 68th out of the thousands of mammal species known to humanity.

References

Podogymnura
Mammals of the Philippines
EDGE species
Endemic fauna of the Philippines
Fauna of Dinagat Islands
Taxonomy articles created by Polbot
Mammals described in 1982